Diego Pellicer Worldwide Inc. is a Seattle-based company which has a premium brand of cannabis. It is a publicly listed company that sells cannabis products over the counter. The company was founded by Jamen Shively who named it after his great-grandfather. Ron Throgmartin is the CEO of the company.

In May 2013, the owner of Diego Pellicer expressed a desire to establish a national chain of marijuana dispensaries. In October 2019, the company announced letters of intent to purchase retail, manufacturing, and cultivation properties in Colorado.

References

External links

Cannabis companies of the United States
Companies traded over-the-counter in the United States
Companies based in Seattle